Röthenbach station is a Nuremberg U-Bahn station and is the terminus of the U2 line.

References

Nuremberg U-Bahn stations
Railway stations in Germany opened in 1986
1986 establishments in West Germany